Asier del Horno Cosgaya (born 19 January 1981) is a Spanish retired footballer who played as a left back.

After solid displays with Athletic Bilbao, for which he appeared in 126 official games in five years scoring 17 goals, he moved to Chelsea in England, where he won the Premier League in the 2005–06 season.

Subsequently, del Horno – who missed the 2006 World Cup with Spain due to a last-minute injury – returned to his country with Valencia, who loaned him to several clubs for the duration of his contract. He dealt with several physical problems in the latter part of his career, amassing La Liga totals of 187 matches and 15 goals.

Club career

Athletic Bilbao
Born in Barakaldo, Biscay, del Horno began his career at Athletic Bilbao in 1999, where his combative tackling and strength in the air saw him rise through the ranks as a left-footed central defender. However, his pace and ability to contribute to the attack led to his being switched to the flank by the time he had arrived in the seniors for both club and country.

Del Horno made his first-team debut in the 2000–01 opener at only 19, and finished his first season at the San Mamés Stadium with 14 games to help the Basques finish in 12th position.

Chelsea
In June 2005, del Horno moved to Chelsea for a fee of £8 million. He won the first and only league championship of his career with the Blues, as part of the squad that conquered the Premier League title.

During his spell at Stamford Bridge, del Horno played 34 overall matches and scored once, against Tottenham Hotspur at White Hart Lane in a 2–0 victory on 27 August 2005. The following 22 February, late into the first half of a UEFA Champions League round-of-16 clash at home against FC Barcelona, he received a straight red card for a foul on Lionel Messi, as his team went on to lose the match 1–2 and the tie 2–3.

Valencia
On 21 July 2006, del Horno returned to Spain to sign for Valencia CF on a six-year contract worth €8 million, seen as a natural replacement for Amedeo Carboni who had retired at 41. Athletic Bilbao had expressed interest, but withdrew from further negotiations, forfeiting any further financial advantage; following surgery on his injured Achilles heel, which kept him off the pitches for most of the season, he made his debut for his new team on 3 March 2007 in a 1–0 home win over RC Celta de Vigo.

Del Horno was placed on the transfer list by manager Quique Sánchez Flores, as the latter announced that the defender would not retain his position for 2007–08. In the last day of the transfer window, he agreed to join his former club Athletic on a one-year loan deal, returning to Valencia after an injury-filled campaign. At the Che, his physical problems persisted and, after an unassuming first half of 2009–10 – only played in the Copa del Rey and only when facing rivals of smaller entity – he was loaned to Real Valladolid until the end of the season, on 30 January; an undisputed starter since his arrival, he could not however prevent the Castile and León side from returning to Segunda División, after a three-year stay in the top division.

For 2010–11, 29-year-old del Horno was loaned once again, joining freshly promoted side Levante UD. He was used regularly in both defensive positions as the Valencians eventually retained their league status, but also missed the final stretch due to physical ailments which had been bothering him since early into the campaign.

Later years
Upon returning to Valencia, del Horno's contract was immediately terminated. In early August 2011, he re-joined Levante on a permanent deal.

After again dealing with injury throughout the season, where he was not able to dislodge 35-year-old Juanfran from the left-back position, del Horno was released.

International career
Del Horno made his Spain debut on 3 September 2004, against Scotland. He scored the winner in a 1–0 friendly with England played in Madrid, two months later.

An ankle injury forced del Horno to withdraw from the 23-man squad named by Luis Aragonés for the 2006 FIFA World Cup in Germany. Medical staff in the Royal Spanish Football Federation alleged that Chelsea had prior knowledge of the former's injury, but allowed him to continue playing; subsequently, his vacant position was controversially filled in by naturalised Argentinian Mariano Pernía, of Getafe CF.

Del Horno also represented the Basque Country regional team.

Career statistics

Club

International goals
(Spain score listed first, score column indicates score after each Del Horno goal)

Honours
Chelsea
Premier League: 2005–06
FA Community Shield: 2005

References

External links

 
 
 CiberChe stats and bio 
 
 
 
 

1981 births
Living people
Spanish footballers
Footballers from Barakaldo
Association football defenders
La Liga players
Segunda División B players
Bilbao Athletic footballers
Athletic Bilbao footballers
Valencia CF players
Real Valladolid players
Levante UD footballers
Premier League players
Chelsea F.C. players
Spain youth international footballers
Spain under-21 international footballers
Spain international footballers
Basque Country international footballers
Spanish expatriate footballers
Expatriate footballers in England
Spanish expatriate sportspeople in England